The following lists events that happened during the year 1992 in Bosnia and Herzegovina.

Incumbents
President: Alija Izetbegović
Prime Minister: Jure Pelivan (until November 9), Mile Akmadžić (starting November 9)

Events

January
 January 9 - Bosnian Serbs declare their own republic within Bosnia and Herzegovina, in protest of the decision by Bosniaks and Bosnian Croats to seek EC recognition.

March
 March 1 - The first victims of the Bosnian War are a Serb groom's father and an Orthodox priest in a Sarajevo shooting.

April
April 5 - Bosnian War
 The Assembly of Bosnia and Herzegovina (without the presence of Serb political delegates) proclaims independence from the Socialist Federal Republic of Yugoslavia.
 Serb troops, following a mass rebellion of Serbs in Bosnia and Herzegovina against the Bosnian declaration of independence from Yugoslavia, besiege the city of Sarajevo.
 April 7 - The United States and the European Community recognize the independence of Bosnia and Herzegovina.

References

 
Years of the 20th century in Bosnia and Herzegovina
1990s in Bosnia and Herzegovina
Bosnia and Herzegovina
Bosnia and Herzegovina